Gedung Island is an islet in South Seberang Perai District, Penang, Malaysia, located off the coast of Seberang Perai.

See also

 List of islands of Malaysia

References 

Islands of Penang
South Seberang Perai District